Shane Robert Bieber (born May 31, 1995) is an American professional baseball pitcher for the Cleveland Guardians of Major League Baseball (MLB). He played college baseball for the UC Santa Barbara Gauchos baseball team as a walk-on. He was drafted by the Indians in the fourth round of the 2016 Major League Baseball draft. Bieber made his MLB debut with Cleveland in 2018, was named an All-Star in 2019 and 2021, and received the American League's 2020 Cy Young Award.

Early life 
Bieber attended Laguna Hills High School in Laguna Hills, California. Bieber's pitch speed reached the mid-80s as a junior and his command was very strong. He was recruited to play college baseball at University of California, Santa Barbara as a walk-on and did not receive much attention from many other programs. As a senior in 2013, he pitched to an 8–4 record with a 1.40 ERA.

After graduating, he enrolled at Santa Barbara where he played for the UC Santa Barbara Gauchos baseball team as a walk-on. He earned a scholarship by his sophomore year. In 2014, he played collegiate summer baseball in the West Coast League for the Cowlitz Black Bears. In 2015, he played collegiate summer baseball in the Cape Cod Baseball League for the Yarmouth-Dennis Red Sox. In 2016, his junior year, he went 12–4 with a 2.74 ERA in 18 starts. He was drafted by the Cleveland Indians in the fourth round of the 2016 Major League Baseball draft.

Professional career

Minor leagues 
Bieber signed and made his professional debut with the Mahoning Valley Scrappers, where he spent the whole season, posting a 0.38 ERA in 24 innings. He spent 2017 with the Lake County Captains, Lynchburg Hillcats, and Akron RubberDucks, pitching to a combined 10–5 record with a 2.86 ERA in 28 starts between the three teams.

On May 25, 2018, Bieber pitched a rain-shortened seven-inning no-hitter for the Triple-A Columbus Clippers against the Gwinnett Stripers.

Cleveland Indians / Guardians

2018–19 

The Indians purchased Bieber's contract on May 31, 2018, and added him to their active roster. He made his major league debut that evening, starting against the Minnesota Twins at Target Field. He pitched 5.2 innings, giving up four runs (all earned) and eight hits while walking one and striking out six as the Indians defeated Minnesota 9–8. Bieber finished his rookie season with an 11–5 record, a 4.55 ERA, and 118 strikeouts in 20 appearances.

Owning a 7–3 record with a 3.54 ERA over 18 games (17 starts) to begin the 2019 season, Bieber was named an MLB All-Star for the first time, for the All-Star Game played at Progressive Field in Cleveland. He struck out the side on 19 pitches in the fifth inning as the American League won, 4–3. He received the All-Star Game Most Valuable Player Award. Bieber finished the season with a 15–8 record in 34 games (33 starts). In  innings, he struck out 259.  For the season, he received mention for the Cy Young Award voting for the first time, placing fourth in the American League.

2020: Cy Young, Pitching Triple Crown 
The Indians made Bieber their Opening Day starting pitcher in 2020.  They faced the Kansas City Royals on July 24, 2020, at Progressive Field.  Bieber struck out 14 batters in six innings in a 2–0 victory, setting a team record for most strikeouts by a starting pitcher on Opening Day.  In his next start on July 30 versus the Minnesota Twins, he struck out 13 batters in eight innings, tying Karl Spooner for the most strikeouts by a pitcher in their first two starts in a season.

In August, Bieber started six games and recorded a 1.63 ERA with 57 strikeouts, including five starts with double figures in strikeouts.  Upon reaching 50 innings for the season, Bieber had tallied 84 strikeouts, the most by a starting pitcher in MLB history in that span, according to the Elias Sports Bureau.  At the end of the month, he had led the majors in ERA (1.20), strikeouts (84), wins (six) and innings.  He was named American League Pitcher of the Month, his first monthly award in the major leagues. Bieber reached 100 strikeouts at the -inning mark versus Minnesota, the fastest in terms of innings pitched in one season in MLB history, passing Max Scherzer with 63 innings in 2018.

For the 2020 season, Bieber became the first pitcher since Justin Verlander (who won in 2011 with the Detroit Tigers), to capture the American League pitching triple crown (8 wins, 1.63 ERA, 122 strikeouts) as the AL leader in each of the three categories. He also led the AL in WAR (3.2), won-loss percentage (.889), fewest hits per 9 IP (5.353), and strikeouts per 9 IP (14.198).

In the 2020 American League Wild Card Series against the New York Yankees, Bieber allowed seven runs on nine hits in  innings and the Indians were defeated 12–3. They lost the best-of-three series, 2–0, following a 10–9 loss on Game 2. Bieber was awarded the AL Cy Young Award after the season.

2021
On February 18, 2021, it was announced that Bieber had tested positive for COVID-19. However, he recovered in time to be the Indians' Opening Day starter for the 2021 season. On June 14, Bieber was placed on the injured list with a subscapularis strain. He was later transferred to the 60-day injured list on July 25. Bieber was activated off of the injured list on September 24.

2022
On March 22, 2022, Bieber signed a $6 million contract with the Guardians, avoiding salary arbitration.

In 2022 he was 13–8 with a 2.88 ERA in 200.0 innings.

On January 13, 2023, Bieber agreed to a one-year, $10.01 million contract with the Guardians for the 2023 season, avoiding salary arbitration.

Personal life
Bieber and longtime girlfriend, Kara, got engaged in July 2021. During the baseball season, Bieber resides in Westlake, Ohio, a suburb of Cleveland.

With the same last name as Canadian singer Justin Bieber, the Cleveland pitcher chose "Not Justin" as his nickname for Players Weekend in 2019. Justin was seen wearing a "Not Shane Bieber" jersey a few weeks later. Bieber later gifted Justin an Indians jersey. That same year, a Topps baseball card mistakenly called the pitcher "Justin" on the back of the card, with both Biebers joking about the mistake on Twitter.

See also 

 Cleveland Guardians award winners and league leaders
 List of Major League Baseball annual shutout leaders
 List of University of California, Santa Barbara alumni

References

External links 

 Shane Bieber profile at UC Santa Barbara Gauchos

1995 births
Living people
American League All-Stars
American League ERA champions
American League Pitching Triple Crown winners
American League strikeout champions
American League wins champions
Major League Baseball All-Star Game MVPs
Sportspeople from Orange, California
Baseball players from California
Major League Baseball pitchers
Cleveland Indians players
Cleveland Guardians players
UC Santa Barbara Gauchos baseball players
Yarmouth–Dennis Red Sox players
Mahoning Valley Scrappers players
Lake County Captains players
Lynchburg Hillcats players
Akron Rubbermen players
Columbus Clippers players
Cy Young Award winners
Gold Glove Award winners